Hammonton High School is a comprehensive community public high school that serves students in ninth through twelfth grades from Hammonton, in Atlantic County, New Jersey, United States, operating as the lone secondary school of the Hammonton Public Schools.

Students from Folsom Borough and Waterford Township attend Hammonton High School as part of sending/receiving relationships with the Folsom Borough School District and the Waterford Township School District.

As of the 2021–22 school year, the school had an enrollment of 1,341 students and 92.9 classroom teachers (on an FTE basis), for a student–teacher ratio of 14.4:1. There were 283 students (21.1% of enrollment) eligible for free lunch and 55 (4.1% of students) eligible for reduced-cost lunch.

History
Opened in 2002, Hammonton High School is the newest school facility of the Hammonton Public Schools. The school's  facility on a campus covering  was constructed at a cost of $33 million and opened with 1,200 students from Hammonton, as well as those from Waterford Township who shifted to Hammonton High School after the Lower Camden County Regional School District was dissolved.

Awards, recognition and rankings
Hammonton High School's boys' swimming and diving team was recognized with the Boys Gold Award by the 2005-06 NISCA/Kiefer Scholar Team Award.

The school was the 229th-ranked public high school in New Jersey out of 339 schools statewide in New Jersey Monthly magazine's September 2014 cover story on the state's "Top Public High Schools", using a new ranking methodology. The school had been ranked 288th in the state of 328 schools in 2012, after being ranked 233rd in 2010 out of 322 schools listed. The magazine ranked the school 239th in 2008 out of 316 schools. The school was ranked 233rd in the magazine's September 2006 issue, which surveyed 316 schools across the state. Schooldigger.com ranked the school tied for 175th out of 381 public high schools statewide in its 2011 rankings (an increase of 44 positions from the 2010 ranking) which were based on the combined percentage of students classified as proficient or above proficient on the mathematics (81.2%) and language arts literacy (92.4%) components of the High School Proficiency Assessment (HSPA).

Athletics
The Hammonton High School Blue Devils compete in the Cape-Atlantic League, an athletic conference comprised of public and private high schools in Atlantic, Cape May, Cumberland and Gloucester counties, that operates under the supervision of the New Jersey State Interscholastic Athletic Association (NJSIAA). The school, a founding member of the Cape-Atlantic League in 1949, had been a member of the Tri-County Conference from 2014 to 2020, returning to the Cape-Atlantic League for the 2020-21 school year. With 1,071 students in grades 10-12, the school was classified by the NJSIAA for the 2019–20 school year as Group IV for most athletic competition purposes, which included schools with an enrollment of 1,060 to 5,049 students in that grade range. The football team competes in the Royal Division of the 95-team West Jersey Football League superconference and was classified by the NJSIAA as Group IV South for football for 2018–2020.

The softball team won the Group I state championship in 1980 (defeating Roselle Park High School in the tournament final) and the Group II title in 1986 (vs. Jefferson Township High School). After losing in the finals in both 1977 and 1979, the 1980 team used seven runs scored in the second inning to carry them to the program's first state title with a 7-2 victory in the Group I championship game against Roselle Park played at Mercer County Park. The 1986 team finished the season with a 30-3 record after taking the Group I title with a 4-1 win in extra innings against Jefferson Township in the championship game. The team won the 2007 South, Group III state sectional championship with a 6-5 win over Central Regional High School.

The football team won the NJSIAA South Jersey Group II state sectional championship in 1985, 1993, 1994 and 1996, won the South Jersey Group III sectional in 2009 and the Central Jersey Group IV title in 2019. In its seventh year in the playoffs, the 1985 team won the program's first title after defeating Haddon Heights High School in the South Jersey Group II championship game to end the season with a 9-2 record. The team won the 2009 South Jersey Group III sectional championship with a 23-17 win over Timber Creek Regional High School, the program's first Group III title. The 2019 team won the Central Jersey Group IV title with a 28-12 win against Jackson Memorial High School.

The girls' field hockey team won the South Jersey Group II state sectional title in 1996 and lost to West Essex High School in the Group II finals.

The wrestling team won the South Jersey Group III state sectional championship in 2009

Marching band
The school's marching band was Chapter One champions in 1973-1979 (Group 3), 1980-1981 (Group 4), 1983 (Group 3), 1989-1990 (Group 2) and 1998 (Group 1). The marching band was Atlantic Coast Champion in Group 3 every year from 1974-1979 and again in 1983. The band was the All-State Champion in 2002 and 2005, and the State Champion in 2004 in USSBA competition. The band also won state championships in 2008 USSBA competition as well as in 2016.

Administration
Thomas Ramsay is the school's principal. His administration team includes two assistant principals.

Notable alumni
 Michael Torrissi (class of 1993), politician who was elected to the New Jersey General Assembly from the 8th Legislative District in 2021.

References

External links

Hammonton Public Schools

School Data for the Hammonton Public Schools, National Center for Education Statistics
South Jersey Sports: Hammonton Blue Devils

2002 establishments in New Jersey
Educational institutions established in 2002
Folsom, New Jersey
Hammonton, New Jersey
Waterford Township, New Jersey
Public high schools in Atlantic County, New Jersey